Kathrynann W. Durham (born July 9, 1951) is a judge on the Delaware County Court of Common Pleas and a former Republican member of the Pennsylvania House of Representatives, 160th district from 1979 to 1996.

Early life and education
Durham was born in Chester, Pennsylvania and is a graduate of Widener University and Delaware Law School.  She taught Spanish and English at Northley Jr. High School in Aston, Pennsylvania.

Career

Pennsylvania House of Representative
Durham was elected as a member of Pennsylvania House of Representatives, 160th district in 1978.  She was reelected eight times to two-year terms and served as Majority Chairman of the Consumer Affairs Committee.  Other committee assignments include the Committee on Committees, Insurance, Ethics and the Pennsylvania Export Partnership Advisory Board.

Durham was not a candidate for reelection in 1997 and was replaced by Stephen Barrar.

Delaware County Council
Durham was elected to the Delaware County Council in 1997 and served until 2001.

Delaware County Court of Common Pleas
In 2001, Durham was sworn in as a member of the Delaware County Court of Common Pleas after her appointment to the bench by Pennsylvania Governor Tom Ridge.  She was retained in 2011, and again in 2021, and her current term expires in 2031.

Personal life
Durham is married and had one son.  She resides in Concord, Pennsylvania.

References

1951 births
20th-century American politicians
Judges of the Pennsylvania Courts of Common Pleas
Living people
Republican Party members of the Pennsylvania House of Representatives
Women state legislators in Pennsylvania
20th-century American women politicians
21st-century American judges
21st-century American women judges